Acanthocinini is a tribe of longhorn beetles of the subfamily Lamiinae. It was described by Blanchard in 1845.

Taxonomy

 Acanista Pascoe, 1864
 Acanthocinus Megerle in Dejean, 1821
 Acanthodoxus Martins & Monné, 1974
 Acartus Fahraeus, 1872
 Aegocidnexocentrus Breuning, 1957
 Alcathousiella Monné, 2005
 Alcathousites Gilmour, 1962
 Alcidion Sturm, 1843
 Alloeomorphus 
 Alphinellus Bates, 1881
 Ameipsis Pascoe, 1865
 Amniscites Gilmour, 1957
 Amniscus Dejean, 1835
 Ancylistes Chevrolat, 1863
 Anisolophia Melzer, 1934
 Anisopodesthes Melzer, 1931
 Anisopodus White, 1855
 Antecrurisa Gilmour, 1960
 Antennexocentrus Breuning, 1957
 Antilleptostylus Gilmour, 1963
 Aphronastes Fairmaire, 1896
 Apteralcidion Hovore, 1992
 Apteroleiopus Breuning, 1955
 Astyleiopus Dillon, 1956
 Astylidius Casey, 1913
 Astylopsis Casey, 1913
 Atelographus Melzer, 1927
 Atrypanius Bates, 1864
 Australiorondonia Breuning, 1982
 Australoleiopus Breuning, 1970
 Baecacanthus Monné, 1975
 Baryssiniella 
 Baryssinus Bates, 1864
 Beloesthes Thomson, 1864
 Boninella Gressitt, 1956
 Boninoleiops Hasegawa & Makihara, 2001
 Bourbonia Jordan, 1894
 Brevoxathres Gilmour, 1959
 Bulbolmotega Breuning, 1966
 Callipero Bates, 1864
 Calolamia Tippmann, 1953
 Canidia Thomson, 1857
 Carinoclodia Breuning, 1959
 Carpheolus Bates, 1885
 Carphina Bates, 1872
 Carphontes Bates, 1881
 Catharesthes Bates, 1881
 Chaetacosta Gilmour, 1961
 Chydaeopsis Pascoe, 1864
 Clavemeopedus Breuning, 1969
 Cleodoxus homson, 1864
 Clodia Pascoe, 1864
 Cobelura Erichson, 1847
 Coenopoeus Horn, 1880
 Colobeutrypanus Tippmann, 1953
 Cometochus 
 Contoderopsis Breuning, 1956
 Contoderus Thomson, 1864
 Cosmotoma Blanchard, 1845
 Cristenes Breuning, 1978
 Cristisse Breuning, 1955
 Cristocentrus Breuning, 1957
 Cristurges Gilmour, 1961
 Dectes LeConte, 1852
 Didymocentrotus McKeown, 1945
 Dolichoplomelas Breuning, 1958
 Driopea Pascoe, 1858
 Dryana Gistel & Bromme, 1848 
 Eleothinus Bates, 1881
 Elongatocontoderus Breuning, 1977
 Emeopedopsis Breuning, 1965
 Emeopedus Pascoe, 1864
 Eneodes Fisher, 1926
 Enes Pascoe, 1864
 Eoporis Pascoe, 1864
 Erphaea Erichson, 1847
 Eucharitolus Bates, 1885
 Eugamandus Fisher, 1926
 Euryxaenapta Breuning, 1963
 Eutrichillus Bates, 1885
 Eutrypanus Erichson, 1847
 Exalcidion Monné, 1977
 Exocentroides Breuning, 1958
 Exocentrus Dejean, 1835
 Falsacanthocinus Breuning, 1951
 Falsexocentrus Breuning, 1970
 Falsometopides Breuning, 1957
 Falsovelleda Breuning, 1954
 Fasciculancylistes Breuning, 1965
 Fisherostylus Gilmour, 1963
 Freoexocentrus Breuning, 1977
 Georgeana 
 Glaucotes Casey, 1913
 Goephanes 
 Goephanomimus Breuning, 1958
 Granastyochus Gilmour, 1959
 Graphisurus Kirby, 1837
 Hamatastus Gilmour, 1957
 Hexacona Bates, 1881
 Hiekeia Breuning, 1964
 Hoplomelas Fairmaire, 1896
 Hoploranomimus Breuning, 1959
 Hylettus Bates, 1864
 Hyperplatys Haldeman, 1847
 Idephrynus Bates, 1881
 Inermoleiopus Breuning, 1958
 Intricatotrypanius Breuning, 1959
 Ipochira Pascoe, 1864
 Isse Pascoe, 1864
 Jordanoleiopus Lepesme & Breuning, 1955
 Kallyntrosternidius Vitali, 2009
 Lagocheirus Dejean, 1835
 Lasiolepturges Melzer, 1928
 Lathroeus Thomson, 1864
 Lebisia Breuning, 1958
 Leiopus Audinet-Serville, 1835
 Leptocometes Bates, 1881
 Leptostylopsis Dillon, 1956
 Leptostylus LeConte, 1852
 Leptrichillus Gilmour, 1960
 Lepturdrys Gilmour, 1960
 Lepturgantes Gilmour, 1957
 Lepturges Bates, 1863
 Lepturginus Gilmour, 1959
 Lepturgotrichona Gilmour, 1957
 Lethes Zayas, 1975
 Liopinus Linsley and Chemsak, 1995    
 Lithargyrus Martins & Monné, 1974
 Longilepturges 
 Lophopoenopsis Melzer, 1931
 Lophopoeum Bates, 1863
 Maculileiopus Breuning, 1958
 Mahenes Aurivillius, 1922
 Mahenoides Breuning, 1958
 Maublancancylistes Lepesme & Breuning, 1956
 Mecotetartus Bates, 1872
 Metadriopea Breuning, 1977
 Miaenia Pascoe, 1864
 Microhoplomelas Breuning, 1958
 Microplia Audinet-Serville, 1835
 Micurus Fairmaire, 1896
 Mimacanthocinus Breuning, 1958
 Mimaderpas Breuning, 1973
 Mimagnia Breuning, 1958
 Mimancylistes Breuning, 1955
 Mimapomecyna Breuning, 1958
 Mimectatina Aurivillius, 1928
 Mimeryssamena Breuning, 1971
 Mimexocentroides Breuning, 1961
 Mimexocentrus Breuning, 1958
 Mimhoplomelas Breuning, 1971
 Mimillaena Breuning, 1958
 Mimipochira Breuning, 1956
 Mimocoedomea Breuning, 1940
 Mimodriopea Breuning, 1977
 Mimohoplorana Breuning, 1960
 Mimoleiopus Breuning, 1969
 Mimomyromeus Breuning, 1978
 Mimosophronica Breuning, 1957
 Mimostenellipsis Breuning, 1956
 Mimotrypanius Breuning, 1973
 Mimoxenolea Breuning, 1960
 Mimozygoceropsis Breuning, 1978
 Moala Dillon & Dillon, 1952
 Myrmecoclytus Fairmaire, 1895
 Myrmexocentroides Breuning, 1970
 Myromeus Pascoe, 1864
 Myromexocentrus Breuning, 1957
 Nanustes Gilmour, 1960
 Neacanista Gressitt, 1940
 Nealcidion Monné, 1977
 Neobaryssinus Monné & Martins, 1976
 Neoeutrypanus Monné, 1977
 Neoischnolea Breuning, 1961
 Neopalame Martins & Monné, 1972
 Neosciadella Dillon & Dillon, 1952
 Neseuterpia Villiers, 1980
 Nesomomus Pascoe, 1864
 Nonymodiadelia Breuning, 1958
 Nyssocarinus Gilmour, 1960
 Nyssocuneus Gilmour, 1960
 Nyssodectes Dillon, 1955
 Nyssodrysilla Gilmour, 1962 
 Nyssodrysina Casey, 1913
 Nyssodrysternum Gilmour, 1960 
 Nyssosternus Gilmour, 1963
 Odontozineus Monné, 2009
 Oectropsis Blanchard in Gay, 1851
 Oedopeza Audinet-Serville, 1835
 Olenosus Bates, 1872
 Olmotega Pascoe, 1864
 Ombrosaga Pascoe, 1864
 Onalcidion Thomson, 1864
 Ophthalmemeopedus Breuning, 1961
 Ostedes Pascoe, 1859
 Othelais Pascoe, 1866
 Oxathres Bates, 1864
 Oxathridia Gilmour, 1963
 Ozineus Bates, 1863
 Palame Bates, 1864
 Parabaryssinus Monné, 2009
 Paracanthocinus Breuning, 1965
 Paracartus Hunt & Breuning, 1957
 Parachydaeopsis Breuning, 1968
 Paracleodoxus Monné & Monné, 2010
 Paraclodia Breuning, 1974
 Paracristenes Breuning, 1970
 Paracristocentrus Breuning, 1980
 Paradidymocentrus Breuning, 1956
 Paradriopea Breuning, 1965
 Paraegocidnus Breuning, 1956
 Parahiekeia Breuning, 1977
 Paralcidion Gilmour, 1957
 Paraleiopus Breuning, 1956
 Paramyromeus Breuning, 1956
 Parancylistes Breuning, 1958
 Paranisopodus Monné & Martins, 1976
 Paraprobatius 
 Paratenthras 
 Paratrichonius 
 Paroectropsis 
 Paroecus 
 Pattalinus 
 Pentheochaetes 
 Pertyia 
 Phrissolaus 
 Piezochaerus 
 Probatiomimus 
 Proseriphus 
 Proxatrypanius 
 Pseudastylopsis Dillon, 1956
 Pseudocobelura 
 Pseudocriopsis 
 Pseudolepturges 
 Pseudosparna 
 Pucallpa 
 Pygmaleptostylus 
 Sciadosoma 
 Sporetus 
 Stenolis 
 Sternacutus 
 Sternidius LeConte, 1873
 Sternidocinus Dillon, 1956
 Styloleptoides Chalumeau, 1983
 Styloleptus Dillon, 1956
 Sympagus 
 Tenthras 
 Tomrogersia 
 Toronaeus 
 Trichalcidion 
 Trichalphus 
 Trichastylopsis Dillon, 1956
 Trichillurges 
 Trichocanonura Dillon, 1956
 Trichonius 
 Trichonyssodrys 
 Trichotithonus 
 Tropanisopodus 
 Tropidocoleus 
 Tropidozineus 
 Trypanidiellus 
 Trypanidius Blanchard, 1843    
 Tuberastyochus 
 Urgleptes Dillon, 1956
 Valenus Casey, 1892
 Xenocona 
 Xenostylus 
 Xylergates 
 Xylergatoides

References

 
Lamiinae
Beetle tribes